The 2017 CERH Continental Cup was the 37th season of the CERH Continental Cup, Europe's roller hockey Super Cup, organized by CERH.

Four teams from three federations played for the title on 14 and 15 October 2017 in Viareggio, Italy.

Portuguese club Oliveirense achieved their first title ever.

Format
On 16 May 2017, the CERH announced the new format of the competition, that would be played by the two finalists of the previous editions of the two main European competitions: the CERH European League and the CERS Cup.

Teams

Bracket

References

External links
 2017 Continental Cup at CERH website

Continental Cup (rink hockey)
Continental Cup